The Omo–Tana languages are a branch of the Cushitic family and are spoken in Ethiopia, Djibouti, Somalia and Kenya. The largest member is Somali. There is some debate as to whether the Omo–Tana languages form a single group, or whether they are individual branches of Lowland East Cushitic. Blench (2006) restricts the name to the Western Omo–Tana languages, and calls the others Macro-Somali.

Internal classification
Mauro Tosco (2012) proposes the following internal classification of the Omo-Tana languages. Tosco considers Omo-Tama to consist of a Western branch and an Eastern ("Somaloid") branch, which is a dialect chain of various Somali languages and the Rendille–Boni languages (see also Macro-Somali languages).

Omo-Tana
Western ("Galaboid" or "Arboroid") branch
Dhaasanac
Arbore
Elmolo
Yaaku
Eastern ("Somaloid") branch
Rendille
Karre–Boni
Tunni–Dabarre
Ashraaf
Maay
Somali

References